Kumait FC  is a Saudi Arabian football team in Marat City playing at the Saudi Third Division.

Ascending to Second Division
He promoted to the Saudi Second Division after the decision of the Saudi Arabian Football Federation to ascend 8 clubs.

References

Kumait
1978 establishments in Saudi Arabia
Association football clubs established in 1978
Football clubs in Marat